Moline Acres is a city in St. Louis County, Missouri, United States. The population was 2,442 at the 2010 census.

Geography
Moline Acres is located at  (38.746483, -90.242838).

Demographics

2010 census
As of the census of 2010, there were 2,442 people, 942 households, and 643 families living in the city. The racial makeup of the city was 6.3% White, 92.1% African American, 0.2% Native American, 0.2% from other races, and 1.1% from two or more races. Hispanic or Latino of any race were 0.8% of the population.

There were 942 households, of which 36.6% had children under the age of 18 living with them, 26.8% were married couples living together, 35.0% had a female householder with no husband present, 6.5% had a male householder with no wife present, and 31.7% were non-families. 28.6% of all households were made up of individuals, and 9.7% had someone living alone who was 65 years of age or older. The average household size was 2.59 and the average family size was 3.16.

The median age in the city was 37.4 years. 27.1% of residents were under the age of 18; 9% were between the ages of 18 and 24; 23.2% were from 25 to 44; 28.2% were from 45 to 64; and 12.5% were 65 years of age or older. The gender makeup of the city was 42.8% male and 57.2% female.

2000 census
As of the census of 2000, there were 2,662 people, 1,001 households, and 691 families living in the city. The racial makeup of the city was 12.17% White, 85.54% African American, 0.04% Native American, 0.26% Asian, 0.04% Pacific Islander, 0.26% from other races, and 1.69% from two or more races. Hispanic or Latino of any race were 0.30% of the population.

There were 1,001 households, out of which 35.6% had children under the age of 18 living with them, 34.5% were married couples living together, 30.5% had a female householder with no husband present, and 30.9% were non-families. 27.9% of all households were made up of individuals, and 8.4% had someone living alone who was 65 years of age or older. The average household size was 2.66 and the average family size was 3.24.

In the city, the population was spread out, with 30.4% under the age of 18, 9.0% from 18 to 24, 26.2% from 25 to 44, 24.1% from 45 to 64, and 10.2% who were 65 years of age or older. The median age was 34 years. For every 100 females, there were 77.5 males. For every 100 females age 18 and over, there were 72.8 males.

The median income for a household in the city was $32,229, and the median income for a family was $34,663. Males had a median income of $25,703 versus $26,467 for females. The per capita income for the city was $12,739. About 16.7% of families and 19.4% of the population were below the poverty line, including 25.1% of those under age 18 and 14.8% of those age 65 or over.

Education
The St. Louis County Library Lewis and Clark Branch is located in Moline Acres.

References

Cities in St. Louis County, Missouri
Cities in Missouri